Maoriblatta is a genus of cockroaches belonging to the family Blattidae.

The species of this genus are found in Australia.

Species:

Maoriblatta albipalpis 
Maoriblatta brunni 
Maoriblatta laevipennis 
Maoriblatta novaeseelandiae 
Maoriblatta rufoterminata 
Maoriblatta sublobata

References

Blattidae
Blattodea genera